The 1918 Los Angeles Angels season was the 16th season for the Los Angeles Angels playing in the Pacific Coast League (PCL).  The PCL season ended early on July 14 due to wartime travel restrictions and the Spanish flu pandemic. When the season was suspended, the Angels were in second place with a 57–47 record.

A postseason series was held between the Angels and the first-place Vernon Tigers. The Angels won the championship series by five games to two, winning the final game on July 22, 1918, at Washington Park. Right fielder Sam Crawford and shortstop Zeb Terry led the Angels in the championship series with nine hits each. Terry also scored seven runs in the series.

Doc Crandall was the Angels' top pitcher, appearing in 25 games and compiling a 16–9 record and 2.06 earned run average (ERA).

First baseman Jack Fournier was the team's top hitter, appearing in all 104 games and compiling a .325 batting average with 26 doubles and 13 triples.

Red Killefer was the team's manager and also appeared in 99 games while compiling a .298 batting average.

1918 PCL standings

Statistics

Batting 
Note: Pos = Position; G = Games played; AB = At bats; H = Hits; Avg. = Batting average; HR = Home runs; SLG = Slugging percentage

Pitching 
Note: G = Games pitched; IP = Innings pitched; W = Wins; L = Losses; PCT = Win percentage; ERA = Earned run average

References

Further reading
 "The Greatest Minor League: A History of the Pacific Coast League, 1903-1957", by Dennis Snelling (McFarland 2011)
 "The Los Angeles Angels of the Pacific Coast League: A History, 1903-1957", by Richard Beverage (McFarland 2011)

1918 in sports in California
Pacific Coast League seasons